The men's aerials event in freestyle skiing at the 2010 Winter Olympics in Vancouver, Canada took place on 22 February for the qualification round.  The final was held on 25 February.  Both events were held at the Cypress Bowl Ski Area in Cypress Provincial Park, West Vancouver, British Columbia.

Results

Qualification
The qualification was held on 22 February at 18:00.

Final
The final was held on 25 February 2010 at 18:00.

References

Men's freestyle skiing at the 2010 Winter Olympics
Men's events at the 2010 Winter Olympics